This article is a list of saints by the pope who canonized them.

Although popes have been canonizing saints since at least 993 and have claimed sole authority to do so since the late 12th century, it has been rare historically for any pope to canonize more than a handful of saints.

9th Century

Pope Nicholas I 
Pope Nicholas I canonized one saint.

Pope Adrian II 
Pope Adrian II canonized one saint.

Pope John VIII 
Pope John VIII did not canonize any saints.

Pope Marinus I 
Pope Marinus I did not canonize any saints.

Pope Adrian III 
Pope Adrian III did not canonize any saints.

Pope Stephen V 
Pope Stephen V did not canonize any saints.

Pope Formosus 
Pope Formosus did not canonize any saints.

Pope Boniface VI 
Pope Boniface VI did not canonize any saints.

Pope Stephen VI 
Pope Stephen VI did not canonize any saints.

Pope Romanus 
Pope Romanus did not canonize any saints.

Pope Theodore II 
Pope Theodore II did not canonize any saints.

Pope John IX 
Pope John IX did not canonize any saints.

10th Century

Pope Benedict IV 
Pope Benedict IV did not canonize any saints.

Pope Leo V 
Pope Leo V did not canonize any saints.

Pope Sergius III 
Pope Sergius III did not canonize any saints.

Pope Anastasius III 
Pope Anastasius III did not canonize any saints.

Pope Lando 
Pope Lando did not canonize any saints.

Pope John X 
Pope John X did not canonize any saints.

Pope Leo VI 
Pope Leo VI did not canonize any saints.

Pope Stephen VII 
Pope Stephen VII did not canonize any saints.

Pope John XI 
Pope John XI did not canonize any saints.

Pope Leo VII 
Pope Leo VII canonized one saint.

Pope Stephen VIII 
Pope Stephen VIII did not canonize any saints.

Pope Marinus II 
Pope Marinus II did not canonize any saints.

Pope Agapetus II 
Pope Agapetus II did not canonize any saints.

Pope John XII 
Pope John XII did not canonize any saints.

Pope Benedict V 
Pope Benedict V did not canonize any saints.

Pope Leo VIII 
Pope Leo VIII did not canonize any saints.

Pope John XIII 
Pope John XIII canonized one saints.

Pope Benedict VII 
Pope Benedict VII canonized one saint.

Pope John XIV 
Pope John XIV did not canonize any saints.

Pope John XV 
Pope John XV canonized one saint.

Pope Gregory V 
Pope Gregory V did not canonize any saints.

Pope Sylvester II 
Pope Sylvester II canonized one saint.

11th Century

Pope John XVII 
Pope John XVII did not canonize any saints.

Pope John XVIII 
Pope John XVIII did not canonize any saints.

Pope Sergius IV 
Pope Sergius IV did not canonize any saints.

Pope Benedict VIII 
Pope Benedict VIII canonized one saint.

Pope John XIX 
Pope John XIX canonized three saints.

Pope Sylvester III 
Pope Sylvester III did not canonize any saints.

Pope Benedict IX 
Pope Benedict IX canonized two saints

Pope Clement II 
Pope Clement II canonized one saint.

Pope Damasus II 
Pope Damasus II did not canonize any saints.

Pope Leo IX 
Pope Leo IX canonized nine saints

Pope Victor II 
Pope Victor II did not canonize any saints.

Pope Stephen IX 
Pope Stephen IX did not canonize any saints.

Pope Nicholas II 
Pope Nicholas II did not canonize any saints.

Pope Alexander II 
Pope Alexander II canonized four saints.

Pope Gregory VII 
Pope Gregory VII canonized nine saints

Pope Victor III 
Pope Victor III did not canonize any saints.

Pope Urban II 
Pope Urban II canonized six saints.

12th Century

Pope Paschal II 
Pope Paschal II canonized four saints.

Pope Gelasius II 
Pope Gelasius II did not canonize any saints

Pope Callixtus II 
Pope Callixtus II canonized five saints

Pope Honorius II 
Pope Honorius II did not canonize any saints

Pope Innocent II 
Pope Innocent II canonized three saints.

Pope Celestine II 
Pope Celestine II did not canonize any saints.

Pope Lucius II 
Pope Lucius II did not canonize any saints.

Pope Eugene III 
Pope Eugene III canonized two saints.

Pope Anastasius IV 
Pope Anastasius IV did not canonize any saints.

Pope Adrian IV 
Pope Adrian IV canonized three saints.

Pope Alexander III 
Pope Alexander III canonized seven saints.

Pope Lucius III 
Pope Lucius III canonized four saints.

Pope Urban III 
Pope Urban III did not canonize any saints.

Pope Gregory VIII 
Pope Gregory VIII did not canonize any saints.

Pope Clement III 
Pope Clement III canonized four saints.

Pope Celestine III 
Pope Celestine III canonized nine saints

13th Century

Innocent III 
Pope Innocent III canonized nine saints.

Honorious III 
Pope Honorious III canonized nine saints.

Gregory IX 
Pope Gregory IX canonized five saints.

Celestine IV 
Pope Celestine IV did not canonize any saints.

Innocent IV 
Pope Innocent IV canonized six saints.

Alexander IV 
Pope Alexander IV canonized three saints.

Urban IV 
Pope Urban IV canonized two saints.

Clement IV 
Pope Clement IV canonized one saint.

Gregory X 
Pope Gregory X did canonized one saint.

Innocent V 
Pope Innocent V did not canonize any saints.

Adrian V 
Pope Adrian V did not canonize any saints.

John XXI 
Pope John XXI did not canonize any saints.

Nicholas III 
Pope Nicholas III did not canonize any saints.

Martin IV 
Pope Martin IV canonized one saint.

Honorius IV 
Pope Honorius IV did not canonize any saints.

Nicholas IV 
Pope Nicholas IV did not canonize any saints.

Celestine V 
Pope Celestine V did not canonize any saints.

Boniface VIII 
Pope Boniface VIII canonized three saints.

14th Century

Benedict XI 
Pope Benedict XI did not canonize any saints.

Clement V 
Pope Clement V canonized one saint.

John XXII 
Pope John XXII canonized three saints.

Benedict XII 
Pope Benedict XII did not canonize any saints.

Clement VI 
Pope Clement VI canonized one saint.

Innocent VI 
Pope Innocent VI did not canonize any saints.

Urban V 
Pope Urban V canonized two saints.

Gregory XI 
Pope Gregory XI did not canonize any saints.

Urban VI 
Pope Urban VI canonized one saint.

Boniface IX 
Pope Boniface IX canonized two saints.

15th Century

Innocent VII 
Pope Innocent VII did not canonize any saints.

Gregory XII 
Pope Gregory XII did not canonize any saints.

Martin V 
Pope Martin V canonized one saint.

Eugene IV 
Pope Eugene IV canonized three saints.

Nicholas V 
Pope Nicholas V canonized two saints.

Callixtus III 
Pope Callixtus III canonized five saints.

Pius II 
Pope Pius II canonized one saint.

Paul II 
Pope Paul II did not canonize any saints.

Sixtus IV 
Pope Sixtus IV canonized six saints.

Innocent VIII 
Pope Innocent VIII canonized two saint.

Alexander VI 
Alexander VI canonized one saint.

Pius III 
Pope Pius III did not canonize any saints.

16th Century

Julius II 
Pope Julius II canonized six saints.

Leo X 
Pope Leo X canonized eleven saints.

Adrian VI 
Pope Adrian VI canonized one saint.

Clement VII 
Pope Clement VII canonized one saint.

Paul III 
Pope Paul III canonized two saints.

Julius III 
Pope Julius III did not canonize any saints.

Marcellus II 
Pope Marcellus II did not canonize any saints.

Paul IV 
Pope Paul IV did not canonize any saints.

Pius IV 
Pope Pius IV did not canonize any saints.

Pius V 
Pope Pius V canonized one saint.

Gregory XIII 
Pope Gregory XIII canonized one saint.

Sixtus V 
Pope Sixtus V canonized one saint.

Urban VII 
Pope Urban VII did not canonize any saints.

Gregory XIV 
Pope Gregory XIV did not canonize any saints.

Innocent IX 
Pope Innocent IX did not canonize any saints.

Clement VIII 
Pope Clement VIII canonized five saints.

17th Century

Leo XI 
Pope Leo XI did not canonize any saints

Paul V 
Pope Paul V canonized five saints.

Gregory XV 
Pope Gregory XV canonized six saints.

Urban VIII 
Pope Urban VIII canonized seven saints.

Innocent X 
Pope Innocent X did not canonize any saints.

Alexander VII 
Pope Alexander VII canonized four saints.

Clement IX 
Pope Clement IX canonized three saints.

Clement X 
Pope Clement X canonized eight saints.

Innocent XI 
Pope Innocent XI canonized three saints.

Alexander VIII 
Pope Alexander VIII canonized five saints.

Innocent XII 
Pope Innocent XII canonized two saints.

18th Century

Clement XI 
Pope Clement XI canonized eight saints.

Innocent XIII 
Pope Innocent XIII did not canonize any saints.

Benedict XIII 
Pope Benedict XIII canonized seventeen saints.

Clement XII 
Pope Clement XII canonized five saints.

Benedict XIV 
Pope Benedict XIV canonized ten saints.

Clement XIII 
Pope Clement XIII canonized six saints.

Clement XIV 
Pope Clement XIV did not canonize any saints.

Pius VI 
Pope Pius VI did not canonize any saints.

19th century

Pius VII 
Pope Pius VII canonized five saints.

Leo XII 
Pope Leo XII canonized two saints.

Pius VIII 
Pope Pius VIII did not canonize any saints.

Gregory XVI 
Pope Gregory XVI canonized six saints.

Pius IX 
Pope Pius IX canonized 54 saints in 11 causes.

Leo XIII 

Pope Leo XIII canonized 19 saints in 12 causes.

20th century

Pius X 
Pope Pius X canonized eleven saints.

Benedict XV 
Pope Benedict XV canonized four saints.

Pius XI 

Pope Pius XI canonized 34 saints in 27 causes.

Pius XII 

Pope Pius XII canonized 36 saints. None were group causes.

John XXIII 

Pope John XXIII canonized 10 saints. None were group causes.

Paul VI 

Pope Paul VI canonized 85 saints in 21 causes.

John Paul I 
Pope John Paul I did not canonize any saints.

John Paul II 

Pope John Paul II canonized 482 saints in 110 causes.

21st century

Benedict XVI 

Pope Benedict XVI canonized 45 saints.  None were group causes.

Francis 

Pope Francis has canonized 911 saints in 68 causes, which includes the 813 Martyrs of Otranto as a group.

See also 
 List of saints